Sacrament is a 1996 novel by British author Clive Barker. It follows a wildlife photographer who is obsessed with documenting species of animals that are faced with extinction. It is set in Yorkshire, England, San Francisco and Hudson Bay, Canada and explores how his obsession is connected to his upbringing in Yorkshire. The Author described it as "a story about how we become who we are and how we must deal with what we are by facing up to including the things that happened to us in childhood, good and bad. It's also about what's happening to our planet."

References

1996 British novels
1996 fantasy novels
Novels by Clive Barker
Lambda Literary Award-winning works
Novels set in Yorkshire
Novels set in San Francisco
Novels set in Canada
Novels about photographers
LGBT speculative fiction novels
HarperCollins books